I. C. Brătianu may refer to:

Ion C. Brătianu, a Romanian politician
I. C. Brătianu, Tulcea, a commune in Tulcea County, Romania
Ion Brătianu National College (Pitești) in Pitești, Romania